The Fessi dialect is a dialect of Moroccan vernacular Arabic, or Darija, associated with the city of Fes, especially with the old elite families of the city. It has traditionally been regarded as a prestige dialect over other forms of Moroccan Darija—particularly those seen as rural or 'arūbi ( "of the rural Arabs")—due to its "association with the socio-economic power and dominance that its speakers enjoy at the national level," in the words of Mohammed Errihani. 

Like other urban Moroccan dialects, it is considered "pre-Hilalian". "Pre-Hilalian" in this context refers to dialects believed to descend from the Arabic spoken in the region prior to the arrival of the Banu Hilal and the Banu Ma'qil tribes that began in the 12th century. After this event, "Hilalian" dialects became dominant in the rural regions of central Morocco and are a major component of wider Moroccan Arabic today.

It has traditionally had distinctive linguistic features, many of which were shared with other pre-Hilalian dialects in the region: on the phonological level, these include the stereotypical use of a postalveolar approximant (like the American pronunciation of /ɹ/ in the word "red") in the place of a trilled [r] for /ر/, or a pharyngealized glottal stop or voiceless uvular plosive in the place of a voiced velar plosive ([g]) for /ق/. On the morphosyntactic level, gender distinction in pronouns and verb inflections is neutralized in the second person singular.

Due to social and demographic changes that started in the 20th century such as mass rural migration into the city and the departure of most of the city's old urban elites to Casablanca, these old linguistic features are no longer dominant in the speech of Arabic speakers in Fes today. Prior to the departure of most Jewish residents in the second half of the 20th century, the Jewish community in Fes also spoke an Arabic dialect similar to the rest of city.

Notes

References 

Moroccan Arabic
Fez, Morocco
Judeo-Arabic languages